Santiago Jose Stevenson Ortiz (October 17, 1928 – June 3, 2007) was born in Panama City, Panama. He was a singer, composer and ordained minister.

Since his early age, he felt motivated by singing; therefore, he began his musical Christian ministry when he was 17 years old.  He is considered a pioneer of the Christian music all over Latin America for what he was awarded “El Arpa de Oro” in Miami, Florida in 1989.

The nickname “El Trovador Evangelico” was given to him by a radio program in a Christian broadcasting station in Panama City, where he worked as the Programming Director and Announcer for many years.  He finished his career in English at the University of Panama, and later became high school English teacher, until he decided to resign to devote completely to the Christian music ministry.

He has traveled all over Central, South and North America, and Europe, where he was presented as “El Trovador de las Americas”.

He married miss Eusebia Moreno in 1952, and he has four children, five granddaughters and one grandson.

In 1999 he received a surprise tribute in life, for his 52 years in the musical ministry, to which many friends and Christian Panamanian artists attended.

Discography
Pero Queda Cristo (2002)
America sera para Cristo (2000)
Divino Compañero (2000)
Melodias de Ayer y Hoy (1995)
Jesus, Bella Flor (1989)
El Rey ya viene (1978)
Seré su amigo fiel (1978)
Asi es el amor de Dios (1978)
Un Pastor Amante (1978)
Santiago en Puerto Rico (1976)
La Voz del Evangelio (1970)
Sendas Latinas (1970)
Es Cristo Mi Todo (1970)
Santiago Regresa (1962)
Santiago Canta (1960)

External links
 Website

1928 births
2007 deaths
People from Panama City
Panamanian Christians
Performers of Christian music
20th-century Panamanian male singers
20th-century Panamanian singers
Panamanian educators